Viskase (formerly Visking) is a global corporation based out of Lombard, Illinois, United States that supplies plastic, cellulose, and fibrous film and packaging to the food service industry, including casings for processed meats such as hot dogs and sausages.  Viskase has manufacturing facilities in the United States, Mexico, Brazil and France, as well as sales offices located around the world.

Viskase is a publicly traded company, using the stock symbol .

Company history

Origins 
Edwin O. Freund founder of what would become Viskase sought a readily available replacement for animal intestine casing.  Upon creating a cellulose casing, using the "viscose" process (also used in rayon) he realized the product stuffed well, linked, and was able to withstand the smokehouse. Quite by accident, he discovered that when the casing was removed from the product the sausages retained their shape and were firm. This was the beginning of the skinless frankfurter or hot dog.

In the 1950s, Visking Corporation became a division of Union Carbide.

Products 
 Fibrous
 LCC
 MEMBRA-CEL
 NOJAX
 POLYJAX
 VISCOAT Smoke Master & Color Master
 VISFLEX
 VISMAX

See also 
 Dialysis tubing

References

External links 
 Viskase Corporate Website

Food and drink companies of the United States
Companies traded over-the-counter in the United States
Darien, Illinois
Companies based in DuPage County, Illinois